Love Hurts is the fifth solo album by English singer Elaine Paige, released in 1985, on the Warner Music label. The album peaked at #8 in the UK album chart. Originally released on vinyl record and cassette, the album was later released on CD.

It was the third of Paige's recordings to be produced by Tony Visconti, after Stages in 1983 and Cinema in 1984, and was recorded at his Good Earth Studios in London.

This album saw Paige return to mainstream pop and a move away from her previous two themed albums. Only one song was taken from her musical theatre career: "I Know Him So Well", which had been released as a single in 1984 reached No.1 in the UK chart. It was recorded as a duet with Barbara Dickson for the Chess concept album.
Paige collaborated with Tim Rice on the lyrics for "All Things Considered", which were set to a melody by Vangelis.

Track listing
 "Love Hurts" - 4.59 (Boudleaux Bryant)
 "Sorry Seems to Be the Hardest Word" - 3.29 (Elton John, Bernie Taupin)
 "This Is Where I Came In" - 3.41 (Wendy Waldman, Phil Galdston)
 "All Things Considered" - 3.39 (Vangelis, Tim Rice, Elaine Paige)
 "MacArthur Park" - 6.46 (Jimmy Webb)
 "For You" - 2.45 (Judie Tzuke, Mike Paxman), 
 "My Man and Me" - 4.15 (Andy Hill, Frank Musker)
 "Without You" - 3.15 (Pete Ham, Tom Evans)
 "The Apple Tree" - 4.00 (Chris Difford, Glenn Tilbrook)
 "Shaking You" - 3.50 (Paul Gordon, David Foster, Tom Keane)
 "I Know Him So Well" (Elaine Paige and Barbara Dickson) - 4.14 (Benny Andersson, Tim Rice, Björn Ulvaeus)

Personnel

Musicians 
 Elaine Paige - vocals
 Derek Bramble - bass guitar
 Hugh Burns - guitar
 Andy Duncan - drums
 Michael J. Mullins - backing vocals
 Ray Russell - guitar
 Robin Smith - keyboards, backing vocals
 Barbara Thompson - saxophone
 Tony Visconti - banjo, recorders, backing vocals
 Graham Ward - drums

The Mark Peterson Singers and The London Community Gospel Choir also appeared. The Astarte Session Orchestra was led by Gavyn Wright.

Production
 Producer - Tony Visconti
 Assistant Engineer - Gordon Futter
 "The Apple Tree" Assistant Engineer - Chris Porter
 Orchestrations - Robin Smith
 Programming - Tony Visconti

Certifications and sales

References

1985 albums
Elaine Paige albums
Albums produced by Tony Visconti
Warner Music Group albums